N-acetylhexosamine 1-kinase (NahK, LnpB, N-acetylgalactosamine/N-acetylglucosamine 1-kinase) is an enzyme with systematic name ATP:N-acetyl-D-hexosamine 1-phosphotransferase. This enzyme catalyses the following chemical reaction

 ATP + N-acetyl-D-hexosamine  ADP + N-acetyl-alpha-D-hexosamine 1-phosphate

This enzyme is involved in the lacto-N-biose I/galacto-N-biose degradation pathway in the probiotic bacterium Bifidobacterium longum.

References

External links 
 

EC 2.7.1